Aloa moloneyi is a species of moth of the family Erebidae. It was described by Herbert Druce in 1887. It is found in Cameroon, Eritrea, Ghana, Nigeria, Senegal, Sudan and the Gambia.

References

Moths described in 1887
Erebid moths of Africa